The Irish Organic Farmers and Growers Association (IOFGA) certifies organic food and products throughout the island of Ireland. It is a voluntary organisation and a company limited by guarantee with a membership open to all. 

IOFGA maintains a set of organic production and food processing standards, and operates an inspection scheme for certified members.

IOFGA publishes a bi-monthly magazine called Organic Matters.

See also
Organic certification
Soil Association

External links
IOFGA.org

Organic farming organizations
All-Ireland organisations
Farmers' organizations
Agricultural organisations based in Ireland